The Mosca-Bystritsky MBbis was a fighter aircraft developed and used by the Imperial Russian Air Service during the First World War.

Design and development
After being persuaded to move to Russia, the Italian aircraft designer Francesco E. Mosca worked at the Duks factory, with Bezobrasov, Lerkhe and Yankovski. Mosca also designed a two-seat reconnaissance monoplane similar to contemporary Morane and Nieuport monoplanes which went into production as the Mosca-Bystritsky MB. A smaller single seat version of the MB was also produced as the MBbis, 50 of which were ordered from 1916.

Description
The MB and MBbis were both constructed largely of wood with fabric covering. The wings were mounted in the shoulder position with gaps between the roots and the fuselage, allowing easy access to the cockpit and improved view for the pilot, (pilot and observer). For transport on the ground the wings could be folded to lie along the fuselage sides and the tail-planes folded forward and upwards.

Powered by  Le Rhone 9C or Clerget 7Z engines the MBbis was armed with a single machine gun mounted, either in a fixed forward firing mount firing through the propeller fitted with deflector plates, or in angled or elevated mounts firing outside the propeller disc.

Operators
 
Imperial Russian Air Service

Specifications (MBbis)

References

External links
 Russian Aviation 1916

1910s Russian fighter aircraft
Shoulder-wing aircraft
Rotary-engined aircraft
Aircraft first flown in 1916
Single-engined tractor aircraft